Seyed Alireza Siasirad is an Iranian businessman and reformist politician.
He is currently the deputy secretary-general of Executives of Construction Party, and formerly served as the secretary-general of Iron Ore Producers' and Exporters' Association of Iran (IROPEX).

References 

Living people
Executives of Construction Party politicians
Amirkabir University of Technology alumni
Iranian businesspeople
Year of birth missing (living people)